This article provides information on the First Grade or A Grade premiership deciders of Rugby League competitions held on the Central Coast of New South Wales, Australia. The Match Details sub-section details the individual point-scorers in a match, where known. That section shall be expanded upon in the near future.

The current competition is conducted under the auspices of the Central Coast Division Rugby League, an affiliate of NSW Country Rugby League and the New South Wales Rugby League.

List

Note:
 Most competitions between 1915 and 1936 were decided without a finals series. The premiers being the team with the most points in the league, after an agreed number of rounds. In most seasons, a knock-out competition, usually open to all teams, took place after the premiership was decided.
 During 2003, 2004 and 2005, five of the clubs fielded teams in the Jim Beam Cup or the Newcastle Rugby League. Their reserves team played in this competition, referred to as "First Division", along with the top sides of the other clubs.
 The colour boxes reflected the club colours in the corresponding season. Ourimbah, Wyong, Woy Woy and The Entrance have changed colours during their history.
 Prior to Grand Finals becoming compulsory in 1956, a Grand Final was held only if the minor premier was beaten either in the semi-final of Final.

See also a List of NSW Central Coast Rugby League First Grade Premiers

Match Details
1915 (Top Two Final)
OURIMBAH 3 defeated ERINA nil at Wyong on Saturday, August 29, 1915. Referee: G. Seabrook.

1919 (Play-Off Final)
JILLIBY 5 (J McCullagh try; HG Smith goal) defeated WYONG 3 (Buckton try) on Saturday, August 30, 1919. Referee: Jack Beattie.

1920 (Last Round Decider)
OURIMBAH 10 (Gleddon, McDonald tries; Humphreys 2 goals) defeated ERINA nil at Ourimbah on Saturday, August 15, 1920. Referee: C. Brannigan.

1928 (Play-Off Final)
WYONG SOUTH 4 (A Speers 2 goals) defeated OURIMBAH EAST 2 (Jack Nancarrow goal) at Ourimbah Sportsground on Saturday, August 25, 1928. Referee: William Pateman.

1947
WYONG 15 defeated WOY WOY 2.

1948
OURIMBAH 15 defeated THE ENTRANCE 7.

1949
OURIMBAH 7 (Bill Preston try; Noel Sharpe 2 goals) drew with THE ENTRANCE 7 (Jack Piper try; Fred Fitzsimmons 2 goals) after extra-time at Wyong on September 18, 1949. Referee: W. Hoare.
THE ENTRANCE 15 (W Fitzsimmons, Jack Piper, Fred Fitzsimmons tries; Ted Jeffries 3 goals) defeated OURIMBAH (J Crisp try; Noel Sharpe 4 goals) at Erina on Sunday, October 2, 1949. Referee: W. Hoare.

1950s
1950
GOSFORD 11 (Bert Sharpe try and 4 goals) defeated OURIMBAH 7 (Allan Sharpe try; Bill Preston, Clancy Preston goals) at Wyong on Sunday, August 27, 1950. Referee: Fred Adam.

1951
OURIMBAH 2 (Allan Sharpe goal) drew with ERINA 2 (Lawrence Horsnell goal) at Grahame Park on Sunday, August 12, 1951.
OURIMBAH 15 (Nev Misson 2, A Sparrow tries; William Russ 3 goals) defeated ERINA 2 (Lawrence Horsnell goal). at Grahame Park on Sunday, August 19, 1951. Referee: A. Hextall.

1952 (Final)
OURIMBAH 11 (Allan Sharpe, Arre Lammi, William Russ tries; Noel Sharpe goal) defeated GOSFORD 3 (B Willis try) at Grahame Park on Sunday, August 10, 1952. Referee: W. Hoare.

1953
OURIMBAH 27 (Noel Sharpe 3, Tom Preston, B Walker tries; Noel Sharpe 4, Allan Sharpe 2 goals) defeated ERINA nil at Grahame Park on Sunday, August 30, 1953. Referee: R. Reicheart.

1954 (Final)
OURIMBAH 22 (D Pryor, Nev Missen, Noel Sharpe, Allan Sharpe tries; Noel Sharpe 5 goals) defeated THE ENTRANCE 17 (Ray Lugg, M Patterson, Dave Palmer tries; Dave Palmer 4 goals) in extra-time at Grahame Park on Sunday, August 29, 1954. Referee: A. Hextall.

1955 (Final)
OURIMBAH 11 (Eric Sladden 3 tries; Noel Sharpe goal) defeated THE ENTRANCE 7 (Tommy Brandtman try; Dave Palmer 2 goals) at Grahame Park on Sunday, September 11, 1955. Referee: Deaves.

1956
THE ENTRANCE 12 (Ray Parsons, Col Bakes tries; Dave Palmer 3 goals) defeated OURIMBAH 7 (Kev Williams try; Noel Sharpe 2 goals) at Grahame Park on Sunday, September 16, 1956.

1957
THE ENTRANCE 20 (Dave Palmer 2, Chic Ryan, Jim Sewell tries; Dave Palmer 4 goals) defeated ERINA 2 (Doug Bennett goal) on Sunday, September 1, 1957.

1958
GOSFORD 16 (P. Clayton, L. Bailey tries; M. Ward 3, W. Kirwin 2 goals) defeated THE ENTRANCE 8 (A. Foskett 4 goals) at Grahame Park on Sunday, September 14, 1958.

1959
GOSFORD (Brian Green, Ross Smith tries; L. Bloomfield goal) defeated ERINA 4 (B. Woodbury 2 goals) at The Entrance on Sunday, September 13, 1959.

1960s
1960
OURIMBAH 24 (T. Morris 2, Don Nancarrow, Brian Eden, Allan Sharpe, K. Archbold tries; Brian Eden 2, Noel Sharpe 2 goals) defeated ERINA 12 (B. Short, Ron Nowland tries; Peter Bennett 3 goals) at Erina on Sunday, September 11, 1960.

1961
THE ENTRANCE 19 (Ron Kelk, Chic Ryan, P. Carney tries; Ray Parker 3, Col O’Donnell goals; Ron Kelk field goal) defeated OURIMBAH 10 (P. Deaves, G. Parish tries; Brian Eden 2 goals) at Grahame Park on Sunday, September 10, 1961.

1962
WOY WOY 12 (Eric Rowlands, William Morelli tries; Robert Wallace 3 goals) defeated OURIMBAH 3 (George Lammi try) at Grahame Park on Sunday, September 9, 1962.

1963
GOSFORD 6 (Gary Wilkinson 2 tries) defeated OURIMBAH 5 (Warwick Smallman try; Brian Eden goal) at Grahame Park on Sunday, September 15, 1963. Referee: Les Brookes.

1964
WOY WOY 22 defeated GOSFORD 3.

1965
GOSFORD 7 (Allan Grady try; Pat Bell 2 goals) defeated WOY WOY 2 (Eric Rowlands goal) at Sohier Park, Ourimbah on September 5, 1965. Referee: Bernie Haviland.

1966
WOY WOY 11 (Warren Kain try; Bill Bennett 4 goals) defeated ERINA 9 (A. Nowland try; Peter Bennett 3 goals) in extra-time at Sohier Park on Sunday, September 11, 1966. Referee: Bernie Haviland.

1967
WOY WOY 27 (B. Berry 2, Peter Louis, Charlie Saunders, John Monie, Warren Kain, J. Robinson tries; Bill Bennett 3 goals) defeated WYONG 7 (Jack Fernance try and 2 goals) at Grahame Park on Sunday, October 1, 1967.

1968
WYONG 20 (Allan Hicks 2, Hilton Robinson, Darryl Palmer tries; Jack Fernance 4 goals) defeated WOY WOY 2 (Mick Allen goal) at Sohier Park on Sunday, September 15, 1968. Referee: Barry Winter.

1969
WYONG 26 (Allan Hicks 3, Darryl Palmer, Anthony Quinn, Doug Gleeson tries; Jack Fernance 4 goals) defeated GOSFORD 9 (S. Mison try; R. Bray 3 goals) on Sunday, September 21, 1969.

1970s
1970
WOY WOY 13 (Peter Louis 2, Charlie Saunders tries; Graham Eadie 2 goals) defeated WYONG 6 (Jack Fernance 2 goals; Denis Smith field goal) at Grahame Park on Sunday, September 20, 1970.  Referee: Noel Fenning.

1971
WYONG 30 (Allan Hicks 2, Ken Peel, Denis Smith, Dave Irwin, Denis Atkins tries, Allan Hicks 6 goals) defeated WOY WOY 25 (William Monie, John Archibald, Laurie Wilesmith, Charlie Saunders, Jack Maloney tries; John Archibald 5 goals) at Grahame Park on Sunday, September 26, 1971. Referee: Bernie Haviland.

1972
WOY WOY 16 (Doug Coates, Peter Robertson tries; John Sullivan 5 goals) defeated THE ENTRANCE 12 (Grahame Dell, Bill Sawers tries; N. Bradney 2, Warren Wyatt goals) at Grahame Park on Sunday, September 10, 1972. Referee: Noel Davidson.

1973
GOSFORD 8 (Gary Wilkinson, Dave Trickett tries; Darryl Collins goal) defeated WYONG 4 (Ken Peel 2 goals) at Grahame Park on Sunday, September 16, 1973. Referee: B. Kirwin

1974
WYONG 14 (Les Hannah, Garry Amor tries; Les Hannah 4 goals) defeated UMINA 6 (Wayne Peterson 3 goals) at Grahame Park on Sunday, September 29, 1974.

1975
WOY WOY 17 (Noel Annand try; Paul Condren 7 goals) defeated WYONG 9 (Merrick Lindsay try; Les Hannah 3 goals) at Grahame Park on Sunday, September 21, 1975.

1976
WOY WOY 19 (Steve McKenzie, Warwick Bissaker, Paul Condren tries; Paul Condren 4, Steve McKenzie goals) defeated ERINA 7 (Bruce Fitzpatrick try; Alain Sauvage 2 goals) on Sunday, September 12, 1976. Referee: Les Ballard.

1977
ERINA 10 (Greg Smith, Mick Friend tries; Bruce Fitzpatrick 2 goals) defeated WYONG 7 (Andy Whitbourne try; Les Hannah 2 goals) at Grahame Park on Sunday, September 18, 1977.

1978
GOSFORD 23 (Mick Friend, Grant Cook, John Loveday, Trevor Hoare tries; Ron Gibbs 5 goals) defeated WOY WOY 20 (Frank Edwards 2, Brad Murray, Glen Crompton tries; Greg Hillard 4 goals) on Sunday, September 17, 1978.

1979
WOY WOY 29 (Frank Edwards 2, Greg Hillard, Garry Nissen, Steve McKenzie, Dennis Corrigan tries; Greg Hillard 5 goals) defeated WYONG 7 (David Irwin try; Les Hannah 2 goals) at Grahame Park on Sunday, September 16, 1979.

1980s
1980
WOY WOY 19 (Steven Heath 2, Bill Monie, Dennis Corrigan, Gary Nissen tries; Greg Hillard 2 goals) defeated UMINA 6 (Mick Liubinskas, Allan Rhoades tries) at Grahame Park on Sunday, September 14, 1980. Referee: Bruce Shipton.

1981
ERINA 27 (Bill Monie 2, Paul Mellross, Tony Ashworth, Craig McNee tries; 6 goals) defeated WYONG 7 (Mick Fawcett try; 2 goals) at Grahame Park on Sunday, September 13, 1981.

1982
WYONG 28 (Brian Ferguson 2, Paul Taylor, Barry Sohier, Rob Wellsmore tries; Alan Cheal 6 goals; Geoff Greentree field goal) defeated WOY WOY 10 (Steve Heath, Glen Pollinelli tries; Greg Hillard 2 goals) at Grahame Park on Sunday, September 19, 1982. Referee: Bob Saunders.

1983
GOSFORD 10 (Shayne Rawling try; Noel Annand 3 goals) drew with UMINA 10 (Mick Finnigan, Shane Slattery tries; John MacArthur goal) after extra-time at Grahame Park on Sunday, September 18, 1982. Referee: Jim Wood.

UMINA 26 (Jamie Thompson, Graham Penboss, Gary Lewis, Sam Ferraro tries; John MacArthur 5 goals) defeated GOSFORD 10 (Anthony Clarke; Noel Annand 3 goals) in extra-time at Grahame Park on Sunday, September 25, 1982. Referee: Jim Wood.

1984
WOY WOY 14 (Steve Heath 2, Rick Potts tries; Greg Hillard goal) defeated UMINA 6 (Col Wright try; Colin Wormleaton goal) at Grahame Park on Sunday, September 16, 1984. Referee: Robert Saunders.

1985
WOY WOY 28 (Jerry Psaltis 2, Robert Sainty, Darren Nielsen tries; Tony Jarvis 6 goals) defeated UMINA 6 (Graham Nicoll try; Paul Stanimeros goal) at Grahame Park on Sunday, September 15, 1985. Referee: John Wells.

1986
TERRIGAL-WAMBERAL 16 (Matt Skinner, Colin Wormleaton, Steve McCoy tries; Keith Cook 2 goals) defeated WOY WOY 12 (Mark Besley, Stephen Hall tries; Bob Sainty 2 goals) at Grahame Park on Sunday, September 7, 1986.

1987
WOY WOY 28 (Jeremy Cusack, Mark Jones, Mark Miller, Mark Long, Bob Sainty tries; Mark Jones 4 goals) defeated WYONG 12 (Geoff Todd, Shane Kuhn tries; two goals) at Grahame Park on Sunday, September 6, 1987. Referee: Bob Saunders.

1988
ERINA 12 (Pater Davis, Gary Jones tries; Brian Taylor 2 goals) defeated WYONG 8 (Ian Naden, Bob Mules tries) at Grahame Park on Sunday, September 18, 1988. Referee: Bob Saunders.

1989
THE ENTRANCE 18 (Pat Hart 3 tries; Jason New 3 goals) defeated WYONG 8 (Garry Deaker try; Errol Mehmet 2 goals) at Grahame Park on Sunday, September 10, 1989. Referee: Bob Saunders.

1990s
1990
WYONG 8 (David Perry try; Errol Mehmet 2 goals) defeated ERINA 6 (Dave Kenny try; unnamed goal) at Grahame Park on Sunday, September 9, 1990. Referee: K. Menchin.

1991
ERINA 30 (Warren Douce, Michael Clements, Brett Jackson, Greg Clements, and one other tries; George Cooke 4 goals, one other goal) defeated WOY WOY 8 (One try; John Muggleton goal; one other goal) at Grahame Park on Sunday, September 1, 1991. Referee: Tom Gustard.

1992
WYONG 16 (Wayne Lambkin, David Perry tries; Errol Mehmet 4 goals) defeated ERINA 14 (Michael Clements, Jussi Tillikka tries; Warren Douche 3 goals) at Grahame Park on Sunday, September 13, 1992. Referee: Jim Woods.

1993
THE ENTRANCE 23 (Shane Hawes 2, Sean Gale, Pat Hart tries; Shane Hawes 3 goals; Justin Kidd field goal) defeated WYONG 12 (Tony Gleeson, Richard Phillips tries; Errol Mehmet 2 goals) at Grahame Park at Grahame Park on Sunday, September 5, 1993. Referee: Kelvin Menchin.

1994
UMINA 32 (Adam O’Neill 2, Stewart Galvin 2, Nathan Grey, Scott Murray tries; three unnamed goals; Tony Peters, Scott Murray field goals) defeated WYONG 24 (Len Bevan, Jamie Lovett, Dave Barrett, Dean Amos tries; Mark Breceljnik at least one of four goals) at Grahame Park on Sunday, September 4, 1994. Referee: Kelvin Menchin.

1995
THE ENTRANCE 8 (Pat Hart try; Brian Rees 2 goals) defeated WYONG (Len Bevan try) at Grahame Park on Sunday, September 3, 1995. Referee: Kelvin Menchin.

1996
WYONG 13 (Mark Rudd try; Lindsay Bowne 4 goals; Mark Breceljnik field goal) defeated THE ENTRANCE 6 (Steve McSweeney try; unnamed goal) at Grahame Park on Sunday, September 1, 1996.

1997
WYONG 32(John MacArthur 2, Mark Rudd, Matt Harris, Adam Couzens, Dave Lawton tries; Mark Breceljnik 4 goals) defeated GOSFORD 6 (David King try; goal) at Grahame Park on Sunday, September 7, 1997. Referee: Dave Allen.

1998
WOY WOY 16 (Dave Maryska 2, Danny Mamo, tries; Dave Maryska 2 goals) defeated ERINA 6 (Craig Ashton try; Stephen Davis goal) at Grahame Park on Sunday, August 30, 1998. Referee: Michael Guilbert.

1999
WOY WOY 28 (Shane Ward 2, Duncan Smith, Dave Maryska tries; Dave Maryska 6 goals) defeated WYONG 26 (Mark Rudd, Chris Crotty, Matt Harris, Kevin Turkington, Anthony Fenton tries; Mark Breceljnik 3 goals) at Woy Woy Oval on Sunday, September 5, 1999. Referee: Ray Windle

2000s
2000
THE ENTRANCE 24 (Chris O’Beirne and others tries; goals) defeated WYONG 10 (Josh White and another tries; goal) at Northpower Stadium, Grahame Park on Saturday, August 26, 2000.

2001
WOY WOY 22 (Grant Stuart, Brett Byrne, Elton Connors, Layne Martin tries; Elton Connors, Dave Maryska two of three goals) defeated THE ENTRANCE 16 (John Strange, Ryan Wheele, Steve Ekepati tries; two goals) at Northpower Stadium, Grahame Park on Sunday, September 2, 2001.

2002
WYONG 22 (Matt Ross, Rod Bird and others tries; goals) defeated THE ENTRANCE 8 at Central Coast Stadium, Grahame Park on Sunday, September 1, 2002. Referee: Peter Betts.

2003
THE ENTRANCE 42 (Brian Rees 3, Matt Siedlecki and others tries; Nathan Thomas 5 goals) defeated ERINA 4 at Central Coast Express Advocate Stadium, Grahame Park on Sunday, August 31, 2003.

2004
THE ENTRANCE 23 (Grant Condon 2, C. Mundey, Dane Lear tries; Nathan Thomas 2, Steve Stringer goals; Dane Allen field goal) defeated UMINA 22 (Adam Love 3, Todd Maloney, Michael Romeo tries; Adam Love goal) in extra time at Central Coast Express Advocate Stadium, Grahame Park on Sunday, September 12, 2004.

2005
UMINA BEACH 22 (Todd Maloney 2, Ben Milby, John Hickey, Dave Murray tries; Shane O'Sullivan goal) defeated WOY WOY 14 (Aaron Hamstra, Chris Barry tries; Chris McKenzie 3 goals) at Morrie Breen Oval, Kanwal on Sunday, September 18, 2005.

2006
WOY WOY 48 (D. King 2, D. Hyde, Adam King, T. McLellan, J. McLaren, Shane Wilson, M. Silvia tries; T. McLellan 5, Jade Mason 1 goals) defeated UMINA BEACH 14 (M. Fawcett, P. Murray, Mitchell Finnigan tries; M. Fawcett goal) at Morrie Breen Oval, Kanwal on Saturday, September 30, 2006.

2007
WOY WOY 31 (A. Bull 2, D. King, J. Jackson, Kyall Walford, B. Rees tries; B. Rees 3 goals; Kyall Walford field goal) defeated UMINA BEACH 6 (Tim Bovis try; Shane O'Sullivan goal) at Woy Woy Oval on Sunday, September 23, 2007.

2008
THE ENTRANCE 50 (Jamen McLeod 2, Kirk Thompson 2, Jason Cook, Ryan Kelly, Ben O'Connell, Dane Allen, Brian Tritton tries; Steve Stringer 6, Jamen McLeod goals) defeated OURIMBAH 4 (Mark Brown try) at Bluetounge Stadium, Grahame Park on Sunday, September 21, 2008.

2009
THE ENTRANCE 52 (Alex Moore 5, Jay Heming, Ryan Kelly, Ben O'Connell, S. Wooden tries; Matthew Nelson 8 goals) defeated NORTHERN LAKES 14 (Benjamin Perkins, Grant Faatoia-Collins, C. Goldie tries; Clinton Allsop goal) at Morrie Breen Oval, Kanwal on Sunday, September 20, 2009.

2010s
2010
OURIMBAH 22 (Noel McLean, Mark Littlefield, Chris Morgan, Jason Thorne tries; Jason Thorne 3 goals) defeated BERKELEY VALE 10 (Steve Lyons, Dane Allen tries; Dane Allen goal) on Saturday, September 18, 2010.

2011
BERKELEY VALE 38 (Jamel Afoa 2, Daniel York 2, B. Holden, Lincoln Tubridy, Nathan Simpson tries; D. Kelly 5 goals) defeated OURIMBAH 18 (Alexander Lash, Jason Thorne, Taylor Mildren tries; David McLean 2, Jason Thorne goal) at Morrie Breen Oval, Kanwal on Saturday, September 17, 2011.

2012
KINCUMBER 12 (Blake Wagner, Ryan Cribb tries; Matthew Nelson 2 goals) defeated UMINA BEACH 10 (Chad Walsh, Luke McDonald tries; Ben Brooks goal) at Morrie Breen Oval on Saturday, September 15, 2012.

2013
BERKELEY VALE 21 (Brett MacDonald 2 tries, Robert Tandy, Joel Eastment tries; Brett MacDonald 2 goals; Ben Fitzsimmons field goal) defeated ERINA (Brayden Cain, Jamie Feeney, Brice Roberts, Dayn Marson tries; Brayden Cain goals) at Morrie Breen Oval on Saturday, September 21, 2013.

2014
WYONG 8 (Luke Sharpe try; Blake Carter, Brent Murray goals) defeated BERKELEY VALE 6 (Alex Moore try; Ryan Drew goal) at Morrie Breen Oval on Saturday, September 20, 2014.

2015
THE ENTRANCE 22 (Grant Nelson 2, Timothy Nawaqatabu, Shaune Corrigan tries; Adam McInnes 3 goals) defeated KINCUMBER 14 Troy Woodley, James Duchatel tries; Brayden Cain 3 goals) at Morrie Breen Oval on Saturday, September 19, 2015.

2016
WYONG 20 (Blake Carter, Nick O'Meley, Mitch Nakhoul, Nick Lynn tries; Brad Keighran 2 goals) defeated WOY WOY nil at Woy Woy Oval on Saturday, September 17, 2016.

Sources

Digitised newspapers at the National Library of Australia's Trove website
  Gosford Times and Wyong District Advocate
  The Newcastle Herald
Microfilm of the following newspapers are available at the State Library of New South Wales and Central Coast Council libraries at Gosford and Wyong. The RAV numbers provided are those used by the State Library. 
  Gosford Times (RAV 24 - Reels #1, 1897-1900; #31 to #40, 1955 to 1962)
  Central Coast Express (RAV 61) 
  The Guardian (The Entrance and Wyong) (RAV 63 - Reels #1 and #2, 1933-1959 miscellaneous) 
  Wyong and Lakes District Advocate (RAV 178 - Reel #2, 1932-1956 miscellaneous)
The magazine Rugby League Week. Available in a text-only format / version through the State Library of New South Wales website - eResources - Journals.
 Erina Rugby League Football Club
 Woy Woy Roosters
 Fox Sports Pulse
 The following books are available at the Tuggerah Branch of the Central Coast Council Libraries

References

C
C
Australian rugby league lists
Rugby League
Grand finals